The 2005–06 Drexel Dragons men's basketball team represented Drexel University during the 2005–06 NCAA Division I men's basketball season. The Dragons, led by 5th year head coach Bruiser Flint, played their home games at the Daskalakis Athletic Center and were members of the Colonial Athletic Association.

Roster

Schedule

|-
!colspan=9 style="background:#F8B800; color:#002663;"| Regular season
|-

|-
!colspan=9 style="background:#F8B800; color:#002663;"| CAA Regular Season

|-
!colspan=9 style="background:#F8B800; color:#002663;"| CAA tournament

Rankings

Awards
Chaz Crawford
CAA All-Defensive Team

Bashir Mason
CAA All-Defensive Team

Dominick Mejia
CAA All-Conference Third Team
CAA Player of the Week

Kenell Sanchez
CAA All-Academic Team

References

Drexel Dragons men's basketball seasons
Drexel
2005 in sports in Pennsylvania
2006 in sports in Pennsylvania